Rajdhar Manikya I (d. 1600), also spelt Rajadhara Manikya, was the Maharaja of Tripura from 1586 to 1600. Formerly a warrior-prince who fought with distinction during his father's reign, upon his own ascension to the throne, Rajdhar showed little interest in such matters, instead becoming occupied with religious pursuits. The decline of Tripura is thought to have begun during his reign.

As heir apparent
Born Rajdhar Narayan, he was the second son of Maharaja Amar Manikya. Following the premature death of his elder brother Rajadurlabha, Rajdhar was named heir apparent in his place and granted his former title of Yuvraj.

Alongside his younger brothers, Amaradurlabha and Jujhar Singh, Rajdhar contributed significantly to his father's military campaigns. In 1581, in what was likely the first expedition of Amar's reign, Rajdhar was dispatched against the insubordinate zamindar of Taraf, Syed Musa. When the latter fled to Fateh Khan, the ruler of Sylhet, Rajdhar marched a formidable military force into the region. In the battle that followed, Khan was defeated and Syed Musa arrested. Rajdhar escorted Khan to Udaipur, where he submitted to the Maharaja's authority.

Following the conquest of Noakhali and Chittagong by the Arakanese king Min Phalaung, Rajdhar, commanding a large contingent, was sent into the occupied regions to drive out the invaders. The army landed in Chittagong and Rajdhar, alongside his brother Amaradurlabha and the generals Chandradarpa-Narayan and Chattrajit Najir, led the capture of six enemy camps successively before halting at Ramu. The Arakanese, following a failed retaliatory assault, blockaded the troops, resulting in the latter's supplies soon dwindling. Additionally, the Portuguese soldiers who formed part of the Tripura army were enticed to desert, turning their camps over to the enemy. This forced the Tripuri to begin retreating back to Chittagong, though at the Karnaphuli River, they were attacked and defeated by the Arakanese, resulting in heavy casualties. However, upon reaching Chittagong, Rajdhar had the army reorganised and launched a counter-assault, capturing seven of the enemy fortresses and forcing their retreat.

After a brief hiatus, a second invasion of Chittagong was launched by Min Phalaung. The Tripura army were routed in the ensuing conflict, with Rajdhar's younger brother Jujhar Singh being killed and he himself suffering a serious bullet wound. The Arakanese then invaded Tripura itself, penetrating all the way to Udaipur and having it sacked and plundered. As a result of this humiliation, Rajdhar's father committed suicide, with his mother later performing Sati in the king's funeral pyre.

Reign
With the Arakanese having abandoned the capital after their pillaging, Rajdhar returned and claimed his father's throne, adopting the traditional royal title of "Manikya". His reign is believed to have commenced in 1586.

Rajdhar proved himself to be a ruler of spiritual leanings. Avoiding the battlefield and having little interest in the administration of his kingdom, he instead devoted himself to religious pursuits. A patron of Vaishnavism, under his rule the influence of the sect spread significantly throughout Tripura. A temple to Vishnu was constructed in Udaipur and eight Brahmins were employed to perform devotional songs before the idol perpetually. Its gardens were adorned with fruit and flowering plants and the Maharaja visited it daily. Rajdhar was also considered  notable for his great respect for Brahmins, participating in religious discussions with the 200 in his court and distributing significant amounts of land to them, in spite of opposition from his nobles.

It is perhaps because of Rajdhar's devout manner that the ruler of Bengal invaded Tripura during this time, though the practical reason was likely to obtain access to the kingdom's elephants. This campaign ultimately failed, with the attacking army being repelled by the veteran general Chandradarpa-Narayan. The actual identity of the invader is uncertain, though the most likely individual would have been the Mughal governor of the region, Man Singh I.

Death and legacy
Whilst walking on the banks of the Gomti River, Rajdhar, absorbed in meditation and drinking water in which an image of Vishnu had been washed, fell into the river and drowned. His death is believed to have occurred in 1600.
 
Rajdhar is depicted in the Rajmala as a benevolent monarch, affable and religious-minded, and charitable both with Brahmins and his subjects; a reputation he likely deserved. However, it was through his aloofness in regards to the running of his kingdom that Tripura's decline began. Royal power waned and lost territory was never regained, with the morale of the military also being decreased. This culminated in the kingdom's nadir during the reign of his son Yashodhar Manikya, who ultimately fell victim to external imperial aggression.

Rajdhar was succeeded by Ishwar Manikya, whose relation to him is uncertain.

References

Bibliography

Kings of Tripura
History of Tripura
1600 deaths
Deaths by drowning in India